The 1999 Eurotel Slovak Open doubles was the tennis doubles event of the first edition of the most prestigious tournament in Slovakia. Belgian team Kim Clijsters and Laurence Courtois won the title, defeating Olga Barabanschikova and Lilia Osterloh in the final.

Seeds

Draw

Qualifying

Seeds

Qualifiers
 ''' Stanislava Hrozenská /  Andrea Šebová

Qualifying draw

References
 ITF doubles results page

Eurotel Slovak Open - Doubles